Fairmont is a census-designated place (CDP) in Will County, Illinois, United States. The population was 2,389 at the 2020 census.

Geography
Fairmont is located at  (41.562673, -88.062305).

Demographics

2020 census

Note: the US Census treats Hispanic/Latino as an ethnic category. This table excludes Latinos from the racial categories and assigns them to a separate category. Hispanics/Latinos can be of any race.

2000 Census
At the 2000 census, there were 2,563 people, 861 households and 626 families living in the CDP. The racial makeup of the CDP was 36.17% White, 53.61% African American, 0.23% Native American, 0.47% Asian, 0.04% Pacific Islander, 6.32% from other races, and 3.16% from two or more races. Hispanic or Latino of any race were 10.89% of the population.

There were 861 households, of which 30.0% had children under the age of 18 living with them, 43.2% were married couples living together, 20.4% had a female householder with no husband present, and 27.2% were non-families. 21.8% of all households were made up of individuals, and 7.2% had someone living alone who was 65 years of age or older. The average household size was 2.97 and the average family size was 3.48.

Age distribution was 27.6% under the age of 18, 11.0% from 18 to 24, 28.1% from 25 to 44, 21.2% from 45 to 64, and 12.1% who were 65 years of age or older. The median age was 34 years. For every 100 females, there were 103.1 males. For every 100 females age 18 and over, there were 102.4 males.

The median household income was $40,907, and the median family income was $47,257. Males had a median income of $28,438 versus $26,696 for females. The per capita income for the CDP was $17,260. About 7.5% of families and 14.0% of the population were below the poverty line, including 22.3% of those under age 18 and 7.6% of those age 65 or over.

References

Census-designated places in Will County, Illinois
Lockport, Illinois
Census-designated places in Illinois
Majority-minority cities and towns in Will County, Illinois